
Vujić is a Serbo-Croatian surname, a patronymic derived from the masculine given name Vuja, a diminutive of the name Vuk (meaning "wolf"). The surname has been historically anglicized into Vuyich, Vuyitch, Vuich. In Hungary, the surname is written Vujity, though still pronounced as in Serbo-Croatian.

Notable people 
Vujić
 Joakim Vujić (1772–1847), Serbian writer, dramatist, actor, traveler and polyglot
 Statuette of Joakim Vujić (Statueta Joakim Vujić), Award of the Knjaževsko-srpski teatar from Kragujevac, Serbia
 The Ring with figure of Joakim Vujić (Prsten sa likom Joakima Vujića), Award of the Knjaževsko-srpski teatar from Kragujevac, Serbia
 Mihailo Vujić (1853–1913), Serbian economist, politician and minister
 Antun Vujić (born 1945), Croatian politician, philosopher, political analyst and lexicographer
 Ivana "Ivy" Vujic (born 1983), Serbian-born Canadian bassist, member of Kittie
 Marko Vujic (born 1984), Bosnian-born Austrian footballer
Jasmina Vujic, Serbian-born American professor of nuclear engineering
Vuich
 Rose Ann Vuich (1927–2001), Serbian-American politician

See also 
 FK Vujić Voda, a football club based in Valjevo, Serbia
 Vujičić
 Vujčić

Serbian surnames
Croatian surnames
Patronymic surnames